Gerard Reynolds (born 10 April 1961) is an Irish former Fine Gael politician from County Leitrim. He was a Senator and later a TD for the Sligo–Leitrim constituency.

Early life and family
Reynolds was born in Ballinamore, County Leitrim, to Patrick J. Reynolds and his wife Tess. He received his secondary education at Garbally College in Ballinasloe, Co Galway. His father Patrick was a Fine Gael TD and senator, and his grandfather Paddy Reynolds had been a TD until his assassination in 1932, when his widow Mary Reynolds was elected to succeed him, and held the seat for 29 years.

Political career
Elected to Seanad Éireann in 1987 on the Industrial and Commercial Panel, Reynolds was first elected to Dáil Éireann at the 1989 general election. He lost his seat at the 1992 general election to Declan Bree as part of the nationwide swing to Labour and returned to the 20th Seanad, elected again by the Industrial and Commercial Panel. He regained his seat at the 1997 general election but lost it again to independent candidate Marian Harkin at the 2002 general election.

He was a member of Leitrim County Council from 1985 to 2014.

See also
Families in the Oireachtas

References

1961 births
Living people
Fine Gael TDs
Members of the 18th Seanad
Members of the 26th Dáil
Members of the 20th Seanad
Members of the 28th Dáil
Local councillors in County Leitrim
Fine Gael senators
People educated at Garbally College